TiMi Studio Group, a subsidiary of Tencent Games, is a video game development studio group headquartered in Shenzhen, China and offices in Singapore, Montréal, Seattle, Los Angeles, Chengdu, and Shanghai. TiMi generated an estimated revenue of $10 billion USD in 2020. Reportedly, TiMi is the largest video game operator and developer in the world by revenue. Founded in 2008 as Jade Studio, TiMi comprises several development divisions with different areas of expertise and develops games in different genres for PC, mobile, and Nintendo Switch, including Honor of Kings, Arena of Valor, Call of Duty: Mobile, Speed Drifters, and Pokémon Unite.

History

2008–2013: Origins as Jade Studio
TiMi began in 2008 as Jade Studio in Shenzhen, China. The studio debuted into the Chinese PC gaming market with QQ Speed (known as GKART and Speed Drifters in Western markets), China's most successful racing game. As of July 2, 2019, Speed Drifters has 700 million registered users, with 200 million registered as mobile players. Following Speed Drifters, the studio released its own massive multiplayer online RPG (MMORPG) titled The Legend of Dragon in 2010 and first-person shooter (FPS) Assault Fire in 2012. In 2013, the studio released their final PC game which is a third-person shooter (TPS) titled Age of Gunslingers before they made their debut into mobile gaming with the release of WeChat exclusive games such as We Match and We Run.

2014–2016: Formation of TiMi Studio Group and Chinese success 
In 2014, Jade Studio merged with Wolong Studio from Chengdu and Tianmeiyiyou Studio from Shanghai to form TiMi Studio Group. Following the merge, in 2015, the group's development division TiMi-L1 debuted into mobile gaming with the massive Multiplayer Online Battle Arena (MOBA) game, Honor of Kings. As of July 2019, Honor of Kings is the most profitable mobile game globally of the first half of 2019, earning more than $728 million.

In 2016, the division introduced the King Pro League (KPL); an official competitive esport for Honor of Kings. The KPL marked the division’ and  studio group' first entry into esports, providing a $12 million prize pool.

2016–2020: Worldwide growth, Arena of Valor, Call of Duty: Mobile, and Pokémon UNITE 
Following the success of Honor of Kings, in 2016, the group's development division TiMi-J6 released Arena of Valor. The MOBA game was launched for mobile and Nintendo Switch in over 50 countries across Asia, Europe, North America and South America, expanding the group's reach worldwide, with more than 13 million monthly active users reported in May 2019. The game became a part of the esports demonstration event at the 2018 Asian Games and 2019 Southeast Asian Games.

On 19 March 2019, at the Game Developers Conference (GDC) in San Francisco, California, Activision announced that they were partnering with TiMi Studio Group to develop their upcoming title, Call of Duty: Mobile. The game was developed by the TiMi-J3 division and released worldwide on 1 October 2019. As of 4 October 2019, the game has surpassed 35 million downloads and over $2 million in revenue. In December 2019, the game received an award for Best Mobile Game at The Game Awards.

In July 2019, it was announced that the studio group and The Pokémon Company are developing a new Pokémon game, which was revealed on 24 June 2020, called Pokémon UNITE, a Multiplayer online battle arena (MOBA) game for mobile and Nintendo Switch.

2020–present: Team Kaiju, Code: J, Records 

In May 2020, the studio group announced ex-343 Industries and Ubisoft developer Scott Warner as Studio Head in North America. Scott Warner will lead TiMi's Team Kaiju (stylized as TEAM KAIJU), which was revealed on 15 October 2021. The subsidiary is working on one unnamed first-person-shooter (FPS) game for the PC and console market.

On 27 June 2020, the studio group and SNK announced a new unnamed mobile game, Code: J, for the classic arcade franchise Metal Slug.

In November 2020, the studio group announced that Honor of Kings set a record of 100 million average daily active users worldwide.

in July 2021, the group established a new division located in Canada, Montréal. The division's classification is TiMi-F1 and the development focus is an AAA open-world game.

In May 2021, the studio group announced a strategic partnership with Xbox Game Studios.

In June 2022, TiMi L1 Studio, a development division of the group, announced a strategic partnership with Level Infinite on publishing Honor of Kings world-wide, where Level Infinite will take over the publishing, eSports, but TiMi the operations and community. The five versus five video game in the multiplayer online battle arena (MOBA) genre will adapt on areas where TiMi J6 Studio's Arena of Valor have a shared eSports with in Honor of Kings World Championship (KCC), under TiMi eSports, but did not reach the expected player base.

In August 2022, Nicolas 'Sparth' Bouvier announced that he had joined Team Kaiju as the Senior Art Director. Previously Sparth had been with the Halo franchise for 14 years, serving as the Art Director for most of that tenure.

List of games

References

External links
 
Team Kaiju

Tencent
Video game companies of China
Video game development companies
Video game publishers
Video game companies established in 2008
Chinese companies established in 2008
Companies based in Shenzhen